Alto Alentejo was a Portuguese province. It was abolished with the Constitution of 1976.

The area is now covered by Alto Alentejo Subregion and Alentejo Central Subregion.

Municipalities
Alandroal Municipality
Alter do Chão Municipality
Arraiolos Municipality
Arronches Municipality
Avis
Borba
Campo Maior Municipality
Castelo de Vide Municipality
Crato
Elvas
Estremoz Municipality
Évora Municipality
Fronteira Municipality
Gavião Municipality
Marvão Municipality
Monforte Municipality
Montemor-o-Novo Municipality
Mora
Mourão Municipality
Nisa Municipality
Ponte de Sôr Municipality
Portalegre Municipality
Portel Municipality
Redondo Municipality
Reguengos de Monsaraz Municipality
Sousel Municipality
Viana do Alentejo Municipality
Vila Viçosa Municipality

External links

Alentejo
Provinces of Portugal (1936–1976)
1936 establishments in Portugal
1976 disestablishments in Portugal